5-O-Methylgenistein is an O-methylated isoflavone. It can be found in Ormosia excelsa, a tropical legume.

References 

O-methylated isoflavones